State of the Nation may refer to:

Speeches made by a head of state to the legislature

State of the Nation
 State of the Nation Address (Belarus), a speech made annually by the President of Belarus to outline the state and condition in which Belarus is in to the Belarusian parliament
 State of the Nation (Somaliland), an annual speech to Parliament given by the President of the Republic of Somaliland
 State of the Nation (Luxembourg), a speech made annually by the Prime Minister of Luxembourg to the national legislature, the Chamber of Deputies
 State of the Nation (Russia), a speech made annually by the Russian President to outline the state and condition in which Russia is in to the Federal Assembly
 State of the Nation Address (Philippines), an annual address by the President of the Philippines to the Congress of the Philippines
 State of the Nation Address (South Africa), an annual event in the Republic of South Africa, in which the President of South Africa reports on the status of the nation
 State of the Nation (Ghana), an annual address to Parliament given by the President of the republic of Ghana covering economic, social, and financial state of the country according to Article 67 of the country's constitution.

Similar titles
 Speech from the throne, in monarchies
September Declaration (Septemberverklaring), Flanders
Neujahrsansprache (New Year's speech), a speech by the President of the Swiss Confederation in front of the Lötschberg Base Tunnel (Lötschbergbasistunnel)
The Speech from the throne (Troonrede) on Prinsjesdag or Prince's Day, the Netherlands
State Opening of Parliament, for the United Kingdom
State of the Union, United States 
State of the State address, a speech customarily given once each year by the governors of most states of the United States
Policy address of Hong Kong

Film
 State of the Nation: Austria in Six Chapters, a 2002 Austrian documentary directed by Michael Glawogger

Television

 State of the Nation (TV series), a series of investigative journalism programmes made by Granada Television from 1966 until 1988
 State of the Nation (Philippine TV program), a news program broadcast on GTV

Music

"State of the Nation" (Industry song), a 1984 song by Industry
"State of the Nation" (New Order song), a 1986 song by New Order
State of the Nation (EP), an EP by The Generators
"State of the Nation", a 1980 song by Fad Gadget from the album Fireside Favourites

See also
State of the Union (disambiguation)